Fly Away or Flyaway may refer to:

Music

Albums
 Fly Away (Banaroo album), 2007
 Fly Away (Corrinne May album), 2001
 Flyaway (Nutshell album), 1997
 Fly Away (Paul Wright album), 2003
 Fly Away (Voyage album), 1978
 Fly Away, by All Angels, 2009
 Fly Away, by Driver Friendly, 2004

Songs
 "Fly Away" (David Foster song), 1980 (popularized by Peter Allen)
 "Fly Away" (Haddaway song), 1995
 "Fly Away" (Honey Ryder song), 2009
 "Fly Away" (John Denver song), 1975
 "Fly Away" (Lead song), 2003
 "Fly Away" (Lenny Kravitz song), 1998
 "Fly Away" (Loretta Lynn song), 1988
 "Fly Away" (Seo In-guk song), 2013
 "Fly Away" (5 Seconds of Summer song), 2015
 "Fly Away" (Tones and I song), 2020
 "Fly Away", by Asami Izawa from the TV series Eureka Seven
 "Fly Away", by The Black Eyed Peas from the album Elephunk, 2003
 "Fly Away", by Blackfoot from the album Marauder, 1981
 "Fly Away", by Cecilia from the album Inner Harmony, 1999
 "Fly Away", by The Cheetah Girls from the soundtrack to the film The Cheetah Girls: One World, 2008
 "Fly Away", by Daniel Powter from his album Under the Radar 
 "Fly Away", by DJ Company
 "Fly Away", by Lutricia McNeal from the album Whatcha Been Doing, 1999
 "Fly Away", a song by Michael Jackson originally intended for the album Bad, 1987 (released 2001)
 "Fly Away", by Misia from the album Kiss in the Sky, 2002
 "Fly Away", by Nelly from the soundtrack to the film The Longest Yard, 2005
 "Fly Away", by Peter Andre from the album Angels & Demons, 2012
 "Fly Away", by Sugarland from the album Twice the Speed of Life, 2004
 "Fly Away", by T-Pain from the album Rappa Ternt Sanga, 2005
 "Fly Away", by TeddyLoid from the soundtrack of the TV series Panty & Stocking with Garterbelt, 2010
 "Fly Away" by TheFatRat ft. Anjulie, 2017
 "Last Dollar (Fly Away)", a 2007 song by Tim McGraw from the album Let It Go
 "Fly Away", dv4d

Other
 Fly Away (film), a 2011 American dramatic film
 Flyaway (novel), a 1978 first-person narrative thriller novel by Desmond Bagley
 Flyaway, a 2012 novel by Lucy Christopher
 FlyAway (bus), a shuttle bus service created and funded by Los Angeles World Airports
 Fly Away (The Following), an episode of the television series The Following
 Flyaway, a type of cheap plastic football also known as a penny floater

See also
 Fly (disambiguation)